Na Klang is a district (amphoe) of Nong Bua Lamphu province, northeastern Thailand.

History
The district was created as a minor district (king amphoe) on 16 July 1965, when the three tambons Na Klang, Kao Kloi, and Na Si were split from Nong Bua Lamphu District. It was upgraded to a full district in 1969.

Geography
Neighboring districts are (from the north clockwise): Suwannakhuha of Nong Bua Lamphu Province; Kut Chap of Udon Thani province; Mueang Nong Bua Lamphu, Si Bun Rueang, and  Na Wang of Nong Bua Lamphu; and Na Duang of Loei province.

Administration
The district is divided into nine sub-districts (tambons), which are further subdivided into 119 villages (mubans). There are two townships (thesaban tambons) within the district. Na Klang covers parts of tambons Na Klang, Dan Chang, and Kut Hae, and Kut Din Chi covers parts of tambon Kut Din Chi. There are a further eight tambon administrative organizations (TAO).

Missing numbers are tambons which are now part of the districts Suwannakhuha and Na Wang

References

External links
amphoe.com

Na Klang